Axiologina ferumequinum is a species of picture-winged fly in the genus Axiologina of the family Ulidiidae.

References

Ulidiinae
Insects described in 1909